Currituck County is the northeastern most county in the U.S. state of North Carolina. As of the 2020 census, the population was 28,100. Its county seat is Currituck. The county was formed in 1668 as a precinct of Albemarle County and later gained county status in 1739. The name is "traditionally said to be an indigenous word for wild geese; Coratank." Currituck County is included in the Virginia Beach-Norfolk-Newport News, VA-NC Metropolitan Area. It is in the northeastern section of the state and is bounded by the Atlantic Ocean, Currituck Sound, Camden County, Dare County and the Commonwealth of Virginia. Currituck Court House, mentioned as early as 1755, was the name of the county seat. Today the words "Court House" have been dropped and only Currituck is used as the town name.

History
Currituck County was created in 1668 from Albemarle County.

Geography

Currituck County includes the northern communities of North Carolina's Outer Banks, separated from mainland Currituck County by the Currituck Sound.

National protected areas
 Currituck National Wildlife Refuge
 Mackay Island National Wildlife Refuge (part)

State and local protected areas/sites 
 Currituck Banks Estuarine Reserve Dedicated Nature Preserve
 Currituck Banks Game Land
 Currituck Banks Reserve
 Currituck Beach Lighthouse
 Currituck Outer Banks Preserve Dedicated Nature Preserve
 Mackay Island National Wildlife Refuge (part)
 Monkey Island
 North River Game Land Dedicated Nature Preserve (part)
 Northwest River Marsh Game Land
 Northwest River Marsh Game Land Dedicated Nature Preserve
 Northwest River Natural Area Preserve (part)
 Princess Anne Wildlife Management Area Pocahontas Marsh Tract (part)

Major water bodies 
 Albemarle Sound
 Atlantic Ocean
 Currituck Sound
 Intracoastal Waterway
 North River
 Northwest River

Adjacent counties
 City of Chesapeake, Virginia - north
 City of Virginia Beach, Virginia - north
 Camden County - southwest
 Dare County - south
 Tyrrell County - southwest

Major highways

Major infrastructure 
 Currituck - Knotts Island Ferry
 Currituck County Regional Airport

Demographics

2020 census

As of the 2020 United States census, there were 28,100 people, 10,522 households, and 7,467 families residing in the county.

2010 census
As of the census of 2010, there were 23,547 people, 6,902 households, and 5,204 families residing in the county.  The population density was 70 people per square mile (27/km2).  There were 10,687 housing units at an average density of 41 per square mile (16/km2).  The racial makeup of the county was 90.3% White, 5.8% Black or African American, 0.5% Native American, 0.6% Asian, 0.0% Pacific Islander, 0.9% from other races, and 1.8% from two or more races.  3.0% of the population were Hispanics or Latinos of any race.

There were 6,902 households, out of which 33.60% had children under the age of 18 living with them, 61.60% were married couples living together, 9.20% had a female householder with no husband present, and 24.60% were non-families. 19.40% of all households were made up of individuals, and 7.60% had someone living alone who was 65 years of age or older.  The average household size was 2.61 and the average family size was 2.98.

The age distribution was 25.30% under the age of 18, 6.70% from 18 to 24, 30.50% from 25 to 44, 25.40% from 45 to 64, and 12.00% who were 65 years of age or older.  The median age was 38 years. For every 100 females there were 98.60 males.  For every 100 females age 18 and over, there were 97.50 males.

The median income for a household in the county was $40,822, and the median income for a family was $46,382. Males had a median income of $32,619 versus $22,641 for females. The per capita income for the county was $19,908.  10.70% of the population and 8.90% of families were below the poverty line.  Out of the total people living in poverty, 16.10% are under the age of 18 and 8.90% are 65 or older.

Government and politics
Politically Currituck is a typical "Solid South" county. It voted more than eighty percent for every Democratic candidate between 1920 and 1948. Currituck never voted Republican until, after voting for American Independent George Wallace in 1968, turning decisively to Richard Nixon in 1972. Since then, Currituck has become a powerfully Republican county. The last Democrat to carry Currituck has been Jimmy Carter in 1980, and at the 2016 election Hillary Clinton received less than a quarter of the county's vote.

The county is run by elected county commissioners, and Currituck County is a member of the Albemarle Commission regional council of governments. Currituck has recently paced all other counties in growth throughout North Carolina, as commuters from the Hampton Roads metro of Virginia as well as work-from-home employees have flocked to the county. The Board of Commissioners placed a moratorium on solar farms in February 2017, but have since rescinded it with two new solar projects in the works as of 2023.

Education
Currituck County Schools are governed by a five-member, elected Board of Education. The following schools are located in the county:
 Central Elementary School
 Currituck County High School
 Currituck County Middle School
 J.P. Knapp Early College High School
 Jarvisburg Elementary School
 Knotts Island Elementary School
 Moyock Elementary School
 Moyock Middle School
 Shawboro Elementary School
 W.T. Griggs Elementary School
 Jarvisburg Christian Academy

Communities

Census-designated places
 Moyock (largest community)
 Coinjock

Townships
 Crawford
 Fruitville
 Moyock
 Poplar Branch

Other unincorporated communities

 Aydlett
 Barco
 Carova Beach
 Corolla
 Currituck (county seat)
 Gibbs Woods
 Grandy
 Gregory
 Harbinger
 Knotts Island
 Jarvisburg
 Mamie
 Maple
 North Swan Beach
 Point Harbor
 Poplar Beach
 Poplar Branch
 Powells Point
 Swan Beach
 Shawboro
 Sligo
 Spot
 Waterlily

Notable people
 Dennis Anderson, former driver, and creator, of the Grave Digger monster truck.
 Emerson Etheridge, congressman and Southern Unionist
 Joseph P. Knapp, publisher, philanthropist and namesake of the J.P. Knapp Early College High School
 Antonin Scalia, Supreme Court Justice, had a beach house in the Corolla community
 Linda Carter Brinson, American journalist
 Macon Brock, Founder of Dollar Tree had a beach house in the Corolla community
 Richard Thurmond Chatham, once owned the hunt club Dews Island in Jarvisburg,
 Thomas Jarvis,  Colonial Governor of North Carolina
 Thomas Jordan Jarvis, Governor of North Carolina
 Henry Marchmore Shaw, Congressman and Confederate officer
 Capt John Gibbs, leader of colonial rebellion, Gibbs Rebellion, and name sake of Gibbs Woods, NC

See also
 List of counties in North Carolina
 National Register of Historic Places listings in Currituck County, North Carolina
 Mid-Currituck Bridge, proposed bride to connect the mainland to Corolla.
 North Carolina Ferry System

References

External links

 
 
 Currituck County Department of Travel and Tourism

 
Outer Banks
1739 establishments in North Carolina
Populated places established in 1739